Iotabrycon praecox is a species of characin endemic to Ecuador, where it is found in the Vinces River basin. This species is the only member of its genus.

References

Characidae
Monotypic fish genera
Endemic fauna of Ecuador
Fish of Ecuador
Taxa named by Tyson R. Roberts